Monte Pora is a mountain of Lombardy, Italy. It is located within the Bergamasque Prealps (a sub-range of Bergamo Alps).

Winter sports 
A ski resort on the mountain offers a total 21 km of Piste ranging from 1370 to 1880 metres of elevation.

References

External links 

Mountains of the Alps
Mountains of Lombardy